Ostrówki may refer to the following places:
Ostrówki, Łódź Voivodeship (central Poland)
Ostrówki, Lublin Voivodeship (east Poland)
Ostrówki, Podlaskie Voivodeship (north-east Poland)
Ostrówki, Greater Poland Voivodeship (west-central Poland)
Ostrówki, Warmian-Masurian Voivodeship (north Poland)